

Governmental

Isfahan University of Technology
Isfahan University
Isfahan University of Medical Sciences
Kashan University of Medical Sciences
Isfahan University of Art
Malek-Ashtar University of Technology
Isfahan University of Farhangian
Mohajer Technical University of Isfahan, Isfahan
University of Kashan
Isfahan University of Social Welfare and Rehabilitation Sciences
Golpayegan University of Engineering
 University of Defence Sciences and Technologies
Al-Musthafa International University-Esfahan Branch

Islamic Azad

Islamic Azad University

Islamic Azad University, Najafabad Branch
Islamic Azad University of Khomeynishahr
Islamic Azad University of Majlesi
Islamic Azad University of Khorasgan ( Isfahan )
Islamic Azad University of Kashan
Islamic Azad University of Felavarjan
Islamic Azad University of Golpayegan
Islamic Azad University of Shahreza
Islamic Azad University of Naeen
Islamic Azad University of Shahinshahr
Islamic Azad University of Dehaghan
Islamic Azad University of Dolatabad
Islamic Azad University of Meyme
Islamic Azad University of Semirom
Islamic Azad University of Fereydan
Islamic Azad University of Tiran

Independent
 Ashrafi Isfahani Institute of Higher Education
 Ragheb Isfahani Higher Education Institute
 Sheikhbahaee University 
 Allameh Feiz Kashani Institute of Higher Education
 Daneshpajoohan Institute of Higher Education
 institute of higher education ACECR-Isfahan
 [https://en.miu.ac.ir/ Al-Musthafa International University-Isfahan}

Isfahan Province
List